Yannick Tremblay (born November 15, 1975) is a Canadian former professional ice hockey defenceman who played in the National Hockey League (NHL) for the Toronto Maple Leafs, Atlanta Thrashers and Vancouver Canucks.

Playing career 
As a youth, Tremblay played in the 1988 Quebec International Pee-Wee Hockey Tournament with a minor ice hockey team from Pointe-aux-Trembles.

Tremblay was drafted 145th overall by the Toronto Maple Leafs in the 1995 NHL Entry Draft. After a three-game stint with the St. John's Maple Leafs, Toronto's American Hockey League (AHL) affiliate club, in 1995–96, he spent the next two seasons splitting time between both Maple Leaf clubs. In 1998–99, he played for the parent club full-time; however, he only played in 35 games.

In 1999, Tremblay was selected by the Atlanta Thrashers in the 1999 NHL Expansion Draft and spent five seasons with the team. His best season statistically in the NHL came in 2002–03, when he scored 8 goals and 22 assists for 30 points in 75 games. By the end of his stint in Atlanta, he solely held the franchise record for most points by a defenceman with 107 until Tobias Enström matched him on 14 January 2010. The 2004–05 NHL season was locked out and Tremblay played in Germany's Deutsche Eishockey Liga (DEL) for Adler Mannheim, eventually staying for a second season. On 28 July 2006, the Vancouver Canucks signed Tremblay, but he only managed to play 12 games with the Canucks as he spent most of the 2006–07 season with the Manitoba Moose, the Canucks' AHL affiliate. Tremblay also currently has the worst plus/minus rating of any player in the Atlanta Thrashers' franchise history with a rating of –103.

Tremblay then signed with HC Lugano of the Swiss National League A (NLA) on 18 July 2007, playing only the 2007–08 season before taking a one-year sabbatical. He returned to the DEL after signing with the Straubing Tigers in July 2009. After one season with DEL, he signed with Graz 99ers.

International play
Tremblay played for Canada at the 2000 IIHF World Championship. The team placed fourth after falling 2–1 to Finland in the third-place match.

Tremblay also represented Canada at the 2007 and 2009 Spengler Cups, winning gold in both tournaments.

Career statistics

Regular season and playoffs

International

References

External links 

1975 births
Living people
Adler Mannheim players
Atlanta Thrashers players
Beauport Harfangs players
Canadian ice hockey defencemen
French Quebecers
Graz 99ers players
HC Lugano players
Manitoba Moose players
Ice hockey people from Montreal
People from Rivière-des-Prairies–Pointe-aux-Trembles
St. John's Maple Leafs players
Straubing Tigers players
Toronto Maple Leafs draft picks
Toronto Maple Leafs players
Vancouver Canucks players
Canadian expatriate ice hockey players in Austria
Canadian expatriate ice hockey players in Germany
Canadian expatriate ice hockey players in Switzerland